Dorma was a German company that produced door technology systems and allied products. It merged with Kaba Holding in September, 2015 and became part of Dormakaba Group.

Overview
Dorma was founded by Wilhelm Dörken and Rudolf Mankel as Dörken & Mankel KG in Ennepetal, Germany,  in 1908. The family business was managed by owner Karl-Rudolf Mankel in third generation. As part of succession planning, previous sole Dorma proprietor Karl-Rudolf Mankel transferred the majority of his shareholding to his daughters Christine and Stephanie in March 2009.

The Dorma Group had a workforce of approximately 6,500 employees and closed the fiscal year 2009/10 with a business volume of 856,4 Mill. EUR.

In April 2015, Dorma Holding announced a planned merger with Swiss-based Kaba Group. The group went on to become Dormakaba Group.

Structure and organization
The company was divided into six divisions: Door Control, Automatics, Glass, Movable Walls, Security Systems & Trade Counters. Dorma’s head office in Ennepetal controlled 69 wholly owned companies in 45 different countries. Its major production plants were located in Europe, China, Malaysia, North and South America.

Product range
Door control: door closers, door furniture and fittings, window handles, hinges and locks
Automatics: automatic door operators, sliding doors, swing doors and revolving doors, automatically operated sliding glass panel partitions
Glass: fittings, door and side panel rails, locks
Security: access control systems, security door fittings, emergency exit control systems, lock and electric keeps, security and detection systems
Movable-Walls: sound-insulating walls, sound-insulating movable glasswalls

References

External links

Companies based in North Rhine-Westphalia
Manufacturing companies of Germany